Choi Soo-sung (1487–1521), was a prominent scholar and painter of the early Joseon period. He was a poet, painter, calligrapher and mathematician.

Life
Choi was born on the west side of Gangneung, in the province of Gangwon-do. He studied poetry and calligraphy in Ulsan. His paintings depicted everyday scenes. When he was 35 years old, he was convicted and sent to prison where he eventually died. After his death, he received honors from the prime minister.

References
 Information gathered and translated from Korean Wikipedia article

See also
Korean painting
List of Korean painters
Korean art
Korean culture

16th-century Korean painters
16th-century Korean calligraphers
16th-century Korean poets
1521 deaths
1487 births
Korean male poets
People from Gangneung